The Rural Municipality of Grass Lake No. 381 is a rural municipality (RM) in the Canadian province of Saskatchewan within Census Division No. 13 and  Division No. 6.

History 
The RM of Grass Lake No. 381 incorporated as a rural municipality on December 13, 1909.

Geography

Communities and localities 
The following unincorporated communities are within the RM.

Localities
 Baljennie
 Donegal
 Reward
 Salvador
 Sunnyglen

Demographics 

Government 
The RM of Grass Lake No. 381 is governed by an elected municipal council and an appointed administrator that meets on the first Tuesday of every month. The reeve of the RM is Scott Vetter while its administrator is Theresa Poschenrieder. The RM's office is located in Luseland.

Transportation 
 Saskatchewan Highway 14
 Saskatchewan Highway 21
 Saskatchewan Highway 31
 Saskatchewan Highway 675

See also 
List of rural municipalities in Saskatchewan

References 

G

Division No. 13, Saskatchewan